Phone Maw Shwe was the Chief Minister of Magway Region, Myanmar from 2011 to 2016. He is a former chairman of the Magway Division Peace and Development Council.

A member of the Union Solidarity and Development Party, he was elected to represent Minbu Township Constituency No. 1 as a Magway Region Hluttaw representative in the 2010 Burmese general election.

References

Government ministers of Myanmar
Burmese military personnel
Living people
Year of birth missing (living people)
Place of birth missing (living people)
Union Solidarity and Development Party politicians